Bruno Pauletto (born 21 January 1954) is a physiologist, an author, a business manager, a former coach and a former Canadian track and field athlete. He graduated from CMU and UT and he published several books and articles on exercise physiology.

During his athlete career he specialized in the shot put events, active 1974 to 1983. An Italian-born athlete, he represented Canada internationally. He set the national Italian record and later became Canadian national record holder in the outdoor shot put. The former title remained unbeaten for six years and the latter for eighteen years. To date he still holds the provincial record of Quebec.

Career highlights 
Bruno Pauletto, MS, CSCS, FNSCA, grew up in Portogruaro, Italy, and Sept-Îles, Quebec, and he graduated as exercise physiologist from the University of Tennessee. Bruno Pauletto represented Canada at two consecutive Commonwealth Games: he won the gold medal in the men's shot put event at the XII Commonwealth Games in Brisbane in 1982, after striking silver in 1978. A year later he participated in the 1979 Pan American Games and placed third. He also took part in the first IAAF World Cup in Düsseldorf in 1977 and the first IAAF World Championships in Athletics in Helsinki in 1983 as a member of the Canadian team and was selected twice for the Olympic Games. He also competed in discus throw.

Having already practiced as coach for strength training and conditioning since 1981, Pauletto devoted his life to coaching as from the 1984 season. He created his own company in 1986, published several articles, videos and three textbooks on strength training, and ultimately was nominated president of the National Strength and Conditioning Association (NSCA) where he also was a member of several committees.

Bruno Pauletto received two national awards for his coaching performances and was inducted into the Hall of Fame of the Central Michigan Chippewas.

Collegiate and university career 
Bruno Pauletto earned his Bachelor of Science in Exercise Physiology in 1978 from the Central Michigan University (CMU), where he was on a track and field scholarship. In 1980 he took his Master of Science in Exercise Physiology at the University of Tennessee (UT).

While at Central Michigan University he competed in the shot put collegiately for their team, the Central Michigan Chippewas, and:
 came fifth in the shot put event at the 1977 NCAA Men's Outdoor Track and Field Championship
 won the 1978 American collegiate NCAA's indoor shot put championships (Division I) with a toss of 64-1 ¼, earning the title of "National Champion"
 took the runner-up spot at the NCAA Outdoors in 1978.

Representing CMU he had much success in the Mid-American Conference:
 he was a MAC outdoor individual champion in shot put in 1976 
 he won the title in shot put again in 1977 (with 63-3 ¾) 
 the same year won the conference title in discus as well, with 160-5 
The latter record was still unmatched in 2009.

In the year 1978 he furthermore:
 established the MAC record (outdoor) posting 65-3, which was still unmatched in 2009
 was named outdoor "MAC Outstanding Performer"
 earned his own university's indoor record by throwing 64-1 and outdoor record with his aforementioned 65-3 throw, both still unmatched in 2012.

Altogether Bruno Pauletto was a three-time All-America shot putter: indoor in 1978 and outdoor in 1977 and 1978.

Since 1990 Pauletto is an inductee of the Hall of Fame of the Central Michigan Chippewas.

Professional athlete career 
Internationally, Pauletto competed for Canada after taking Canadian citizenship.

Later Pauletto set the best Italian shot put mark in 1979 with a  throw during an outdoor event in Milan, Italy, on June 23. Pauletto, who was then competing with the club Telettra-Atletica Rieti, contributed with this throw to place his team sixth at the 1979 National Club Championship. This performance remained the national Italian record until Marco Montelatici beat it in May 1985 with 20.90 m.

Pauletto's first Canadian Championship participation was in Edmundston on March 2–3, 1974. In 1980 he broke the Canadian record in Sherbrooke with a  throw. On 22 May 1983 he established his personal best in shot put with a  throw, achieved at an outdoor event in Knoxville, Tennessee and reaching a new Canadian national senior record. Between 1976 and 1983, only he and Bishop Dolegiewicz won the honour, with the pair dominating the national scene. Thanks to that performance Bruno Pauletto ranks fourth in the list of the top 10 Canadian all-time outdoor ranking (as of 23 July 2012), and he still holds (as of 2013) the outdoor provincial record of Quebec.

His first medal at a major game came in 1978 at the Commonwealth Games held in Edmonton, Alberta, Canada. He gave a better performance at the Pan American Games in San Juan, Puerto Rico in July 1979, clearing , but on that occasion his placing with Dolegiewicz was reversed, as Pauletto claimed the bronze while American Dave Laut won with a throw beyond twenty metres. Pauletto captured the gold medal at the XII Commonwealth Games in Brisbane in 1982 with a mark of  ahead of the English champion Mike Winch. This made him the third Canadian to win the shot put at the Commonwealth Games after Dave Steen in 1970 and women's champion Jane Haist in 1974; Canada had to wait for 28 years until another shot putter, Dylan Armstrong, brought back a Commonwealth gold medal again.

Pauletto also took part at the First IAAF World Championships in Athletics in Helsinki in 1983 as a member of the Canadian team, where he participated in the shot put event ranking 17th in qualifying.

Bruno Pauletto was selected twice for the Olympic Games, in 1980 and in 1984. He could not participate to the 1980 Olympics due to the Olympic boycott of the Moscow Games, which was a part of a package of actions led by the United States to protest against the Soviet–Afghan War. By 1984 he had already started a new career as coach and exercise physiologist and eventually did not compete in any actual Olympic events.

Coaching career, author and business manager 
After graduation at UT Bruno Pauletto was hired as full-time conditioning coach in 1980 and soon became the university's head strength and conditioning coach of the Athletic Department, with a staff of three graduate assistants. He also was the strength coach of the 1985 Tennessee Volunteers football team to represent UT in the NCAA Division I–A football season. While he was UT's coach he also became NSCA Director for the State of Tennessee and, in 1985, he published his first articles on strength training including on Power Clean.

He left that position to manage his and his wife's own company headquartered in Knoxville, Tennessee, founded in 1986 and registered under the name Power Systems. The company is specialized in supplying fitness and sports performance training equipment and solutions for clients ranging from sports teams and health clubs to schools, fitness specialists and other professionals of the exercise industry. In 2012 Power Systems signed a cooperation agreement with Life Fitness, a division of Brunswick Corporation. «Power Systems is a Christian-based business and we follow those guidelines in all aspects of the company; All of our business transactions reflect a firm commitment to our core value… Integrity», Bruno Pauletto says.

From June 1991 to June 1994 Bruno Pauletto was elected President of the National Strength and Conditioning Association (NSCA). In view of the financial imbalance of the Association in 1991 Pauletto introduced a tighter cost control, and the efficiency gains achieved under his management allowed to consolidate a sound financial situation. He also was a member of several NSCA committees.

During that period of time Bruno Pauletto published three books on strength training: for coaches, for football and for basketball. In 2007 he invented and patented a new type of exercise hurdle.

He was also a member of the editorial board of the magazine  Training & Conditioning (T&C).

Awards

Personal 
 1986: "College Strength and Conditioning Professional of the Year Award", presented by the National Strength and Conditioning Association (NSCA) in July 1986
 1990: inducted into the Hall of Fame of the Central Michigan Chippewas
 1997: "President's Award", presented by the National Strength and Conditioning Association (NSCA)
 2008: "Lifetime Achievement Award", presented at the annual conference of the NSCA in July 2008.

Business awards 
 2004, 2007, 2008: three-time "NOVA 7 Supplier Award" winner in the category "Best Free Weights and Specialized Equipment Supplier", presented by Fitness Management Magazine
 2008: Occupational Safety / Health Award Program, "Perfect Record Award" for operating 117,960 employee hours without occupational injury or illness involving days away from work, granted by the National Safety Council (NSC)
 2009: selected in the list of the 25 Best Employers in Tennessee by Business Tennessee Magazine 
 2010: "Achievement Award", presented by the Tennessee Center for Performance Achievement Award
 2011: "Vendor of the Year" award, presented by Gold's Gym Franchisee Association (GGFA).

Achievements

Personal bests
Shot put outdoor:  (1983)
Shot put indoor:  (1980)

International competitions

National titles
Canadian Track and Field Championships
Shot put: 1978, 1980, 1983
NCAA Men's Indoor Track and Field Championship
Shot put: 1978

Toponyms 
In the year 2008 a public track and field park in Sept-Îles was named Parc Bruno-Pauletto (50° 13' 16").

Publications

Books

Articles 
 
 
 
 
 
 
 
 
 
 
 
  Journals lww

References

External links
 
 
 Bio of Bruno Pauletto on the site of Central Michigan Chippewas
 Biographical note of Bruno Pauletto in the 1985 Football Guide (Sep 1, 1985), published by the University of Tennessee
 

1954 births
Canadian male shot putters
Italian male shot putters
Olympic track and field athletes of Canada
Sportspeople from Quebec
Athletes (track and field) at the 1982 Commonwealth Games
Athletes (track and field) at the 1978 Commonwealth Games
Commonwealth Games gold medallists for Canada
Commonwealth Games silver medallists for Canada
Athletes (track and field) at the 1984 Summer Olympics
Athletes (track and field) at the 1979 Pan American Games
People from Sept-Îles, Quebec
20th-century Canadian people
Italian emigrants to Canada
Canadian expatriate sportspeople in the United States
American people of Italian descent
People from Portogruaro
American businesspeople
Central Michigan University alumni
University of Tennessee alumni
Living people
Commonwealth Games medallists in athletics
Pan American Games medalists in athletics (track and field)
Pan American Games bronze medalists for Canada
World Athletics Championships athletes for Canada
Medalists at the 1979 Pan American Games
Medallists at the 1978 Commonwealth Games
Medallists at the 1982 Commonwealth Games